Mandal is a former municipality in the old Vest-Agder county, Norway. It was located in the traditional district of Sørlandet. The municipality existed from 1964 until 1 January 2020 when the municipalities of Mandal, Lindesnes, and Marnardal were merged to form a new, larger municipality of Lindesnes in what is now Agder county. Mandal was the southernmost municipality in all of Norway, with the tiny skerry of Pysen being the southernmost point of land in Norway.

The administrative centre of the municipality is the town of Mandal. The town of Mandal was the second largest town by population in the old Vest-Agder county after the nearby town of Kristiansand and it is also the fourth largest city in all of the Sørlandet/Agder region. Besides the town of Mandal, the municipality also includes the villages of Bykjernen, Skjebstad, Sånum-Lundevik, Skogsfjord-Hesland, Krossen, Harkmark, Skinsnes-Ime, and Tregde-Skjernøy.

At the time of its dissolution in 2020, the  municipality is the 321st largest by area out of the 422 municipalities in Norway. Mandal is the 77th most populous municipality in Norway with a population of 15,600.

The river Mandalselva is a salmon river that flows through the municipality with its river mouth just outside the town. Mandal has many small, white-painted wooden houses, which is typical of towns at the South Coast of Norway (Sørlandet). The European route E39 highway connecting Kristiansand and Stavanger is the main road through Mandal. There are connecting airplane flights and ferries to Europe from Kristiansand.

General information

The town of Mandal was established as a ladested municipality on 1 January 1838 (see formannskapsdistrikt law). On 1 July 1921, a part of the neighboring municipality of Halse og Harkmark (population: 221) that was next to the town of Mandal was merged with the town. During the 1960s, there were many municipal mergers across Norway due to the work of the Schei Committee. On 1 January 1964, the town of Mandal (population: 5,446) was merged with the rural municipalities of Halse og Harkmark (population: 3,676) and Holum (population: 1,127) to form a new, large municipality of Mandal. On 1 January 1965, an unpopulated area of Mandal called Svalemyren was transferred to the neighboring municipality of Søgne.

On 1 January 2020, the three neighboring municipalities of Mandal, Marnardal, and Lindesnes will be merged into one large municipality called Lindesnes with its administrative centre being the town of Mandal.

Name
The municipality is named after the town of Mandal, which in turn is named after the Mandalen river valley in which it is located. The name Mandal which comes from the Old Norse name Marnardalr. The first element is the genitive case of the river name Mǫrn (now Mandalselva) and the last element is dalr which means "valley" or "dale".

Prior to 1653, the town was named Vesterrisør (meaning "western Risør"). The name was originally referring to the island Risøya outside the town, and the first element was added in the 16th century to distinguish it from the town of Østerrisør (meaning "eastern Risør"), which is now simply called Risør.

Coat of arms
The coat of arms was granted on 2 July 1921, just after Mandal became a town. The official blazon is "Azure, three salmon naiant argent". This means the arms have a blue field (background) and the charge is three salmon shown swimming horizontally and stacked vertically. The salmon have a tincture of argent which means they are commonly colored white, but if the arms are made out of metal, then silver is used. The blue color in the field and the salmon were chosen to symbolize the importance of salmon fishing on the river Mandalselva. Mandal is the southernmost municipality in Norway that has a large salmon population, so therefore, salmon fishing also played a major role in the economic development of the village and its trade with the rest of southern Norway. The municipality usually added a mural crown to the top of the arms to show that the municipality included the town of Mandal. The arms were designed by Hallvard Trætteberg.

Churches
The Church of Norway has two parishes within the municipality of Mandal. It is part of the Mandal prosti (deanery) in the Diocese of Agder og Telemark.

Government
All municipalities in Norway, including Mandal, are responsible for primary education (through 10th grade), outpatient health services, senior citizen services, unemployment and other social services, zoning, economic development, and municipal roads. The municipality was governed by a municipal council of elected representatives, which in turn elected a mayor. The municipality fell under the Kristiansand District Court and the Agder Court of Appeal.

Municipal council
The municipal council  of Mandal was made up of 35 representatives that were elected to four year terms.  The party breakdown of the final municipal council was as follows:

Geography
Mandal bordered the North Sea to the south, the municipality of Lindesnes to the west and northwest, the municipality of Marnardal to the north, and the municipality of Søgne to the east. The municipality includes many islands and skerries along the coast including Hille, Pysen, Skjernøy, and Skogsøy. The Hatholmen Lighthouse and Ryvingen Lighthouse mark the sides of the Mannefjorden which leads north into the town of Mandal. The majority of the municipality is located in the southern Mandalen valley which follows the river Mandalselva.

Climate
Mandal has an oceanic climate (Cfb) with short, cool summers and long, moderately cold and wet winters.

Attractions

Mandal is a very popular holiday resort, with its mild and refreshing summer climate. It is famous for its long-stretching beaches surrounding the town. Sjøsanden (The Sea Sand) is the most famous beach, as it stretches for almost a kilometre just outside the town centre. It is frequently ranked as one of Norway's most popular beaches.

The city center is known for its charming concentration of old, white, wooden houses and the Mandalselva river running through it. Another attraction is the city's church: Mandal Church. It is the largest wooden church in Norway, with 1,800 seats and a pulpit on the wall behind the altar. Also, the library, art gallery, cinema, concert hall, and theater is located in the Buen kulturhus (culture house) which was built in 2012.

The artists Gustav Vigeland, Adolph Tidemand, Amaldus Nielsen, and Olaf Isaachsen are all from Mandal, so the town is sometimes called "The Little Town with the Great Artists".

Hogganvik, in the Sånum-Lundevik area of Mandal, is the site of discovery of the Hogganvik runestone in 2009.

Economy

Mandal is famous for its shipbuilding and engineering industries. There was much trade in sailing ships, where the natural harbor of Kleven at Gismerøya was used. Large yard providing ships and marine equipment in Norway and abroad are Westermoen Hydrofoil and Båtservice yard at Skogfjorden, the later Umoe Mandal. 
 
Moreover, the textile industry has been substantial, with several manufacturing companies that had at most 200-300 employees.

Mandal is also famous for its annual Shellfish festival (Skalldyrfestivalen) the second weekend of August when many people gather in downtown to eat Norwegian seafood.

Twin towns – sister cities
Mandal has sister city agreements with the following places:
 Korsholm, Ostrobothnia, Finland
 Middelfart, Syddanmark, Denmark
 Oskarshamn, Kalmar, Sweden

Notable residents
The sculptor Gustav Vigeland (1869–1943) was born in Mandal, and has a museum dedicated to him here. Vigeland's main achievement is the Vigeland Sculpture Park (Vigelandsparken) in Oslo.
The painter Adolph Tidemand (1814–1876) was also born in Mandal. His most famous painting is the national romantic image of a traditional wedding on the Hardangerfjorden, which he made together with Hans Gude.

See also
Marquis of Mandal

References

External links
Municipal fact sheet from Statistics Norway 

Photograph of Hogganvik runestone with colored runes
Some Photographs of Mandal in August 1986, including the Lodsen Restaurant

Mandal, Norway
Lindesnes
Former municipalities of Norway
1964 establishments in Norway
2020 disestablishments in Norway